Jaunpils Parish is an administrative unit of Tukums Municipality in the Semigallia region of Latvia.
It is the birthplace of Latvian scholar Krišjānis Barons.

Towns, villages and settlements of Jaunpils parish 
 Jaunpils
 Strutele

External links

Parishes of Latvia
Tukums Municipality
Semigallia